Agni Pushpam is a 1976 Indian Malayalam-language film, directed by Jesey and produced by D. P. Nair. The film stars Kamal Haasan, Jayabharathi, Jayan and Sukumari. The film has musical score by M. K. Arjunan.

Cast 

Kamal Haasan as Somu
Jayabharathi as Reshmi
Jayan as Police Inspector
Sukumari
K. P. A. C. Lalitha
Thikkurissy Sukumaran Nair  
Jose Prakash
Manavalan Joseph
Sankaradi
Kuthiravattam Pappu
Adoor Bhavani
M. G. Soman
Master Raghu
N. Govindan Kutty
Reena
Sudheer
Chandraji
T. P. Radhamani

Production 
Agni Pushpam film produced by D. P. Nair under production banner Girish Movie Makers. It was given an "A" (adults only) certificate by the Central Board of Film Certification.

Soundtrack 

The music was composed by M. K. Arjunan and the lyrics were written by O. N. V. Kurup.

References

External links 
 

1976 films
1970s Malayalam-language films